Black And White Swordsman is a 1971 Hong Kong action film with sword fighting directed by Mo Man Hung.

Cast
Kong Ban
Chan Hung-lit
Essie Lin Chia
Chiao Lin
Lee Kui On
Su Chen Ping
Kwan Hung
Wong Jun
Mo Man Hung
Shaw Luo Hui

External links

 HK Cinemamagic entry
 HKMDB entry

1971 films
1971 martial arts films
Hong Kong martial arts films
1970s fantasy action films
Wuxia films
1970s Mandarin-language films
1970s Hong Kong films